The Moskovsky constituency (No. 27) is a Russian legislative constituency in Tatarstan. The constituency covers western Kazan as well as the entirety of western Tatarstan.

Members elected

Election results

1994

|-
! colspan=2 style="background-color:#E9E9E9;text-align:left;vertical-align:top;" |Candidate
! style="background-color:#E9E9E9;text-align:left;vertical-align:top;" |Party
! style="background-color:#E9E9E9;text-align:right;" |Votes
! style="background-color:#E9E9E9;text-align:right;" |%
|-
|style="background-color:"|
|align=left|Oleg Morozov
|align=left|Independent
|-
|46.8%
|-
| colspan="5" style="background-color:#E9E9E9;"|
|- style="font-weight:bold"
| colspan="4" |Source:
|
|}

1995

|-
! colspan=2 style="background-color:#E9E9E9;text-align:left;vertical-align:top;" |Candidate
! style="background-color:#E9E9E9;text-align:left;vertical-align:top;" |Party
! style="background-color:#E9E9E9;text-align:right;" |Votes
! style="background-color:#E9E9E9;text-align:right;" |%
|-
|style="background-color:"|
|align=left|Oleg Morozov (incumbent)
|align=left|Independent
|
|40.48%
|-
|style="background-color:"|
|align=left|Pyotr Chekmarev
|align=left|Communist Party
|
|19.71%
|-
|style="background-color:"|
|align=left|Ildus Sultanov
|align=left|Yabloko
|
|11.47%
|-
|style="background-color:"|
|align=left|Aleksey Mukhin
|align=left|Power to the People
|
|5.03%
|-
|style="background-color:#F5A222"|
|align=left|Makhmut Gareyev
|align=left|Interethnic Union
|
|3.43%
|-
|style="background-color:"|
|align=left|Vladislav Achalov
|align=left|Union of Patriots
|
|3.09%
|-
|style="background-color:"|
|align=left|Vladimir Tolstopyatov
|align=left|Liberal Democratic Party
|
|2.87%
|-
|style="background-color:#0D0900"|
|align=left|Islam Gilyazetdinov
|align=left|People's Union
|
|1.93%
|-
|style="background-color:#000000"|
|colspan=2 |against all
|
|8.38%
|-
| colspan="5" style="background-color:#E9E9E9;"|
|- style="font-weight:bold"
| colspan="3" style="text-align:left;" | Total
| 
| 100%
|-
| colspan="5" style="background-color:#E9E9E9;"|
|- style="font-weight:bold"
| colspan="4" |Source:
|
|}

1999

|-
! colspan=2 style="background-color:#E9E9E9;text-align:left;vertical-align:top;" |Candidate
! style="background-color:#E9E9E9;text-align:left;vertical-align:top;" |Party
! style="background-color:#E9E9E9;text-align:right;" |Votes
! style="background-color:#E9E9E9;text-align:right;" |%
|-
|style="background-color:#3B9EDF"|
|align=left|Oleg Morozov (incumbent)
|align=left|Fatherland – All Russia
|
|45.23%
|-
|style="background-color:"|
|align=left|Vasily Almyashkin
|align=left|Our Home – Russia
|
|15.58%
|-
|style="background-color:"|
|align=left|Nasima Stolyarova
|align=left|Communist Party
|
|11.68%
|-
|style="background-color:#1042A5"|
|align=left|Marat Almukhametov
|align=left|Union of Right Forces
|
|4.52%
|-
|style="background-color:"|
|align=left|Marsel Shamsutdinov
|align=left|Yabloko
|
|3.83%
|-
|style="background-color:#020266"|
|align=left|Valentin Klyuchnikov
|align=left|Russian Socialist Party
|
|3.12%
|-
|style="background-color:"|
|align=left|Ilsur Khusnutdinov
|align=left|Independent
|
|2.12%
|-
|style="background-color:#000000"|
|colspan=2 |against all
|
|9.19%
|-
| colspan="5" style="background-color:#E9E9E9;"|
|- style="font-weight:bold"
| colspan="3" style="text-align:left;" | Total
| 
| 100%
|-
| colspan="5" style="background-color:#E9E9E9;"|
|- style="font-weight:bold"
| colspan="4" |Source:
|
|}

2003

|-
! colspan=2 style="background-color:#E9E9E9;text-align:left;vertical-align:top;" |Candidate
! style="background-color:#E9E9E9;text-align:left;vertical-align:top;" |Party
! style="background-color:#E9E9E9;text-align:right;" |Votes
! style="background-color:#E9E9E9;text-align:right;" |%
|-
|style="background-color:"|
|align=left|Rinat Gubaydullin
|align=left|United Russia
|
|52.68%
|-
|style="background-color:"|
|align=left|Nasima Stolyarova
|align=left|Communist Party
|
|8.52%
|-
|style="background-color:#00A1FF"|
|align=left|Rinat Mukhamadiyev
|align=left|Party of Russia's Rebirth-Russian Party of Life
|
|5.80%
|-
|style="background-color:"|
|align=left|Olga Berdnikova
|align=left|Independent
|
|4.03%
|-
|style="background-color:"|
|align=left|Talgat Abdullin
|align=left|Independent
|
|3.22%
|-
|style="background-color:#1042A5"|
|align=left|Fyodor Fomushkin
|align=left|Union of Right Forces
|
|3.20%
|-
|style="background-color:#65297F"|
|align=left|Yury Korolev
|align=left|Party of Peace and Unity
|
|2.89%
|-
|style="background-color:"|
|align=left|Dmitry Bocharov
|align=left|Liberal Democratic Party
|
|2.81%
|-
|style="background-color:#7C73CC"|
|align=left|Dania Karimova
|align=left|Great Russia – Eurasian Union
|
|1.36%
|-
|style="background-color:#000000"|
|colspan=2 |against all
|
|12.25%
|-
| colspan="5" style="background-color:#E9E9E9;"|
|- style="font-weight:bold"
| colspan="3" style="text-align:left;" | Total
| 
| 100%
|-
| colspan="5" style="background-color:#E9E9E9;"|
|- style="font-weight:bold"
| colspan="4" |Source:
|
|}

2016

|-
! colspan=2 style="background-color:#E9E9E9;text-align:left;vertical-align:top;" |Candidate
! style="background-color:#E9E9E9;text-align:leftt;vertical-align:top;" |Party
! style="background-color:#E9E9E9;text-align:right;" |Votes
! style="background-color:#E9E9E9;text-align:right;" |%
|-
| style="background-color: " |
|align=left|Ildar Gilmutdinov
|align=left|United Russia
|
|74.75%
|-
|style="background-color:"|
|align=left|Khafiz Mirgalimov
|align=left|Communist Party
|
|11.81%
|-
|style="background-color:"|
|align=left|Rustam Ramazanov
|align=left|A Just Russia
|
|3.91%
|-
|style="background-color:"|
|align=left|Andrey Kudryashov
|align=left|Liberal Democratic Party
|
|3.79%
|-
|style="background:"| 
|align=left|Dmitry Karymov
|align=left|Communists of Russia
|
|2.09%
|-
|style="background-color:"|
|align=left|Lyudmila Kukoba
|align=left|Rodina
|
|1.46%
|-
|style="background-color:"|
|align=left|Marsel Shamsutdinov
|align=left|People's Freedom Party
|
|1.34%
|-
| colspan="5" style="background-color:#E9E9E9;"|
|- style="font-weight:bold"
| colspan="3" style="text-align:left;" | Total
| 
| 100%
|-
| colspan="5" style="background-color:#E9E9E9;"|
|- style="font-weight:bold"
| colspan="4" |Source:
|
|}

2021

|-
! colspan=2 style="background-color:#E9E9E9;text-align:left;vertical-align:top;" |Candidate
! style="background-color:#E9E9E9;text-align:left;vertical-align:top;" |Party
! style="background-color:#E9E9E9;text-align:right;" |Votes
! style="background-color:#E9E9E9;text-align:right;" |%
|-
|style="background-color: " |
|align=left|Ildar Gilmutdinov (incumbent)
|align=left|United Russia
|
|70.93%
|-
|style="background-color:"|
|align=left|Stanislav Fedorov
|align=left|Communist Party
|
|8.70%
|-
|style="background-color:"|
|align=left|Ranis Akhmadullin
|align=left|A Just Russia — For Truth
|
|4.92%
|-
|style="background-color:"|
|align=left|Kirill Yevseyev
|align=left|Liberal Democratic Party
|
|4.10%
|-
|style="background-color:"|
|align=left|Robert Sadykov
|align=left|Communists of Russia
|
|3.82%
|-
|style="background-color: " |
|align=left|Rustam Riyanov
|align=left|New People
|
|2.45%
|-
|style="background-color: " |
|align=left|Elvira Zaytseva
|align=left|Party of Growth
|
|1.99%
|-
|style="background-color: "|
|align=left|Vadim Shumkov
|align=left|Party of Pensioners
|
|1.96%
|-
| colspan="5" style="background-color:#E9E9E9;"|
|- style="font-weight:bold"
| colspan="3" style="text-align:left;" | Total
| 
| 100%
|-
| colspan="5" style="background-color:#E9E9E9;"|
|- style="font-weight:bold"
| colspan="4" |Source:
|
|}

Notes

References

Russian legislative constituencies
Politics of Tatarstan